The Britannia Inn is a public house and inn in the English village of Elterwater, Cumbria. Dating to the 17th century, it is a Grade II listed building.Britannia Inn – Historic England

The building is in roughcast stone with a slate roof and two storeys.  On the front is a small gabled porch, and the windows are sashes.  To the left is a recessed bay with a bay window in the angle, and at the rear is a gabled wing.

References

External links

Grade II listed pubs in Cumbria
Hotels in Cumbria
Buildings and structures in Cumbria
17th-century establishments in England